David "Corky" Calhoun (born November 1, 1950) is an American former professional basketball player. Calhoun played in the NBA from 1972–1980 after a collegiate career at the University of Pennsylvania. Calhoun was the 1st round selection (4th overall) of the Phoenix Suns in the 1972 NBA draft. He won an NBA Championship as a member of the 1976–1977 Portland Trail Blazers.

Basketball career

College career 
Calhoun played college basketball for the University of Pennsylvania. In 84 games for the Penn Quakers of the Ivy League, Calhoun averaged 12.7 points and 8.1 rebounds playing under Coach Chuck Daly. As a senior, Calhoun led Penn to the East Regional Final of the NCAA tournament and a 25–3 record.

NBA career 
Calhoun was selected by the Phoenix Suns in the 1972 NBA draft with the 4th overall pick and by the Kentucky Colonels in the 1972 American Basketball Association draft.  Calhoun played for the Phoenix Suns for 3 years before being traded to the Los Angeles Lakers.  He joined the Portland Trail Blazers as a free agent in 1976, and was a member of their championship team that year.  After two seasons with the Blazers, Calhoun was traded to the Indiana Pacers where he was released in the middle of the 1980 season.

Personal life
Calhoun considered playing in France after the NBA, but ultimately took a job offer from Mobil Oil Corporation (now Exxon Mobil) where he worked as U.S. fuels marketing coordinator.

References 
 

Notes

1950 births
Living people
African-American basketball players
American men's basketball players
Basketball players from Illinois
Indiana Pacers players
Kentucky Colonels draft picks
Los Angeles Lakers players
Penn Quakers men's basketball players
Phoenix Suns draft picks
Phoenix Suns players
Portland Trail Blazers players
Small forwards
Sportspeople from Waukegan, Illinois
21st-century African-American people
20th-century African-American sportspeople